Sir Leon Radzinowicz,  (15 August 1906 – 29 December 1999) was a criminologist and academic. He was the founding director of the Institute of Criminology at the Faculty of Law at the University of Cambridge.

Early life
Radzinowicz was born on 15 August 1906 in Łódź, Congress Poland. He studied law as an undergraduate student at the University of Paris and the University of Geneva. He went on to study for a doctorate at the University of Cracow. During this time, he spent a year studying under Enrico Ferri at the Institute of Criminology in Rome, Italy. Radzinowicz moved to England in 1938, having been granted funding by the Polish Ministry of Justice to study the English legal system.

Academic career
During World War II, Radzinowicz established the Department of Criminal Science in the Faculty of Law at the University of Cambridge. From 1949 to 1959, Radzinowicz was Director of the Department of Criminal Science, University of Cambridge. In 1959, he founded the Institute of Criminology at the Faculty of Law at the University of Cambridge. In 1959, he became the first Wolfson Professor of Criminology at the Institute of Criminology. Radzinowicz made a major contribution to the study of criminology by his research in the trends of legal thought which led to modern concepts in the administration of justice which were adopted in many of the democratic countries. Among his most significant works are History of English Criminal Law (4 vols. 1948–68), In Search of Criminology (1961), The Need for Criminology (1965), and Ideology and Crime (1966). Radzinowicz also wrote an autobiography, Adventures in Criminology (1999).

Death
On 29 December 1999, Radzinowicz died in Haverford, Pennsylvania, United States. He was aged 93. He is buried with his third wife in the Ascension Parish Burial Ground in Cambridge, Cambridgeshire, England.

Personal life
Radzinowicz had married three times. He married Irena Szereszewska in 1933; they divorced in 1955. He was married to Mary Ann Nevins from
1958 to 1979. They had two children: Ann and William. In 1979, he married Isolde Klarmann (née Doerenburg; 11 October 1915 – 2 February 2011). Radzinowicz converted to Christianity from Judaism prior to World War II.

Honours
In the 1970 New Years Honours, Radzinowicz was appointed a Knight Bachelor in recognition of his work at the University of Cambridge. On 24 February 1970, he was knighted by Queen Elizabeth II during a ceremony at Buckingham Palace. In 1973, he was elected a Fellow of the British Academy (FBA). On 13 April 1999, he was appointed an honorary Queen's Counsel (QC).

References

External links 
 
Sir Leon Radzinowicz Papers at Florida State University Libraries, Special Collections & Archives

1906 births
1999 deaths
British criminologists
Knights Bachelor
Polish emigrants to the United Kingdom
Jews who immigrated to the United Kingdom to escape Nazism
20th-century Polish Jews
Writers from Łódź
Fellows of the British Academy
Fellows of Trinity College, Cambridge
Honorary King's Counsel
Wolfson Professors of Criminology